Deale is a census-designated place (CDP) in Anne Arundel County, Maryland, United States. The population was 4,945 at the 2010 census. It has a scenic view of Chesapeake Bay and is popular with boaters. Sudley was listed on the National Register of Historic Places in 1973.

Geography

Deale is located at  (38.791766, −76.538933).

Deale is a waterfront fishing village located on the Western Shore of Chesapeake Bay. Four tidal creeks are located in Deale that flow into the bay: Rockhold Creek, Parker Creek, Carrs Creek, and Broadwater Creek. Rockhold Creek is the most commercial of the creeks and is home to several marinas and most of the charter fishing boats. Happy Harbor Restaurant, one of Deale's most famous landmarks, is located on Rockhold Creek.

Demographics

As of the census of 2010, there were 4,945 people, 1,778 households, and 1,313 families residing in the CDP. The racial makeup of the CDP was 91.89% White, 6.01% African American, 0.10% Native American, 0.44% Asian, 0.06% Pacific Islander, 0.15% from other races, and 1.36% from two or more races. Hispanic or Latino of any race were 1.06% of the population.

There were 1,778 households, out of which 35.6% had children under the age of 18 living with them, 59.4% were married couples living together, 10.5% had a female householder with no husband present, and 26.1% were non-families. 19.7% of all households were made up of individuals, and 7.2% had someone living alone who was 65 years of age or older. The average household size was 2.70 and the average family size was 3.11.

In the CDP, the population was spread out, with 26.4% under the age of 18, 6.1% from 18 to 24, 32.7% from 25 to 44, 25.5% from 45 to 64, and 9.3% who were 65 years of age or older. The median age was 38 years. For every 100 females, there were 98.8 males. For every 100 females age 18 and over, there were 97.3 males.

The median income for a household in the CDP was $66,016, and the median income for a family was $73,708. Males had a median income of $41,219 versus $32,708 for females. The per capita income for the CDP was $26,214. About 1.9% of families and 3.7% of the population were below the poverty line, including 4.6% of those under age 18 and 2.7% of those age 65 or over.

Media
Deale was home to WRYR-LP, a low power community radio station owned and operated by the South Arundel Citizens for Responsible Development (SACReD). The station was built by numerous volunteers from Deale and around the region in February 2002 at the first Prometheus Radio Project barnraising. WRYR-LP broadcast music, news, and public affairs to listeners at 97.5FM, until the station's license was cancelled by the Federal Communications Commission on October 2, 2019.

Notable people
John and T.J. Osborne, who comprise the country duo Brothers Osborne, are natives of Deale.

References

External links 

 Deale Area Historical Society

Census-designated places in Maryland
Census-designated places in Anne Arundel County, Maryland
Maryland populated places on the Chesapeake Bay